Gaspard de Coligny may refer to:

Gaspard I de Coligny (c. 1465 - 1522)
Gaspard II de Coligny (1519 – 1572)
Gaspard III de Coligny (1584 – 1646)

See also
Gaspard (disambiguation)
Coligny (disambiguation)